Legend Fighting Championship (Legend FC) started as a Hong Kong-based mixed martial arts (MMA) organisation which invited national champion fighters from throughout the Asia-Pacific to compete for regional supremacy. Legend was unique among MMA tournaments in that it focused exclusively on native Asia-Pacific fighters. The company was sold in April 2014 to Kwokman Productions. The promotion re-launched in September 2018 as a China-based organization.

About Legend

Founded in 2009, Legend Fighting Championship (Legend) was the Asia-Pacific championship of Mixed Martial Arts (MMA). Legend invited national champion MMA fighters from throughout the Asia-Pacific region to compete in a freestyle tournament using interdisciplinary martial arts skills in supervised matches under a strict set of rules designed to promote athlete safety and sportsmanship.  Legend was committed to promoting the sport of MMA throughout the region, to supporting and cultivating its athletes, and to providing exceptional entertainment to a broad audience.

Legend held its first event in January 2010 at Star Hall in Hong Kong in front of an audience of just over 1,000 fans. From this modest start, Legend has grown into one of the most well-known elite-level MMA competitions in the Asia-Pacific, with an international broadcast and some of the top fighters in the region on its roster.

In spring 2011, Legend signed an agreement with Macau mega-resort and casino City of Dreams to produce an ongoing series of MMA tournaments, under the title “City of Dreams exclusively presents Legend Fighting Championship.” The first event of this partnership took place on July 16, 2011.

In January 2012, Legend Fighting Championship announced the signing of an exclusive distribution and syndication agreement with ESPN International (ESPN). Under the terms of the agreement, ESPN will serve as the sole distribution agent of all Legend broadcast content in Asia, Oceania, the Indian sub-continent, Europe, the Middle East and Africa.

Legend's new partners have refocused the company specifically on Chinese fighters and the Chinese market, in terms of both fight cards and the content they will produce. Legend re-launched with a fight card in the southern Chinese city of Guangzhou in September 2018.

In June 2019, Legend announced its return to Macau, China on September 14, 2019 at the MGM Theater in Cotai.

TV broadcast

On the heels of their successful first event, Legend signed a broadcast agreement with KIX (an Asian action TV channel and subsidiary of Tiger Gate Entertainment) to broadcast its MMA competitions in Hong Kong, Singapore, Indonesia, and the Philippines.  Since then, Legend has signed agreements with broadcasters in China, Australia, New Zealand, the United States, and Canada.

In October 2012, Legend signed an agreement with Sony Pictures Television networks for them to broadcast Legend Fighting Championship on AXN in 21 territories across the region.

In November 2012, Legend Fighting Championship and ESPN International announced a broadcast agreement to bring the Asia-Pacific Championship of Mixed Martial Arts to ESPN television and broadband channels in 109 countries in Australia and New Zealand, the Caribbean, Latin America, the Middle East and North Africa, sub-Saharan Africa and cruise ships in these territories.

In North America Legend is broadcast on Pay-Per-View and Video-On-Demand on all the major Pay-Per-View providers and also holds the distinction of being the first sports organisation from China to be featured on North American Pay-Per-View.

China consists of one of the biggest audiences for Legend. In China alone, Legend is available to more than 600 million viewers nationwide. Legend events are also broadcast in China on major video portals Tencent, Weibo, Youku, Zhibo and others. Additional broadcast partners include Guangdong TV, Shenzhen TV, and various other networks in China.

Worldwide, Legend is broadcast in 279 million homes in 152 countries via 22 broadcast partners including AXN in SE Asia, ESPN International and all major pay-per-view operators in the US and Canada.

Company background
Legend was co-founded by Mike Haskamp and Chris Pollak, former classmates and Rugby teammates at Columbia Business School. Pollak spent eight years at management consultancy McKinsey & Company, primarily in their media group. Haskamp was formerly an investment banker at Lehman Brothers. The partners started running the company out of a shared apartment in Hong Kong in late 2009.

In July 2011, Legend closed a venture capital investment from CA Media and Diamond Ridge Ventures. CA Media is a fund focused on media and entertainment businesses throughout the Asia-Pacific region. It was founded by Peter Chernin (former President and COO of News Corporation) and Paul Aiello (former CEO of STAR TV and head of media investment banking at Morgan Stanley Asia). Diamond Ridge is a sports and media investment fund.

After taking a hiatus and securing new partners, Legend re-emerged with Matthew Kwok as its Chairman.  Kwok was the original content and broadcast producer for Legend, and the founder of Kwokman Productions.  In early 2019, Legend announced additional partnerships with athlete manager Audie Attar from Paradigm Sports Management, and Berjaya Assets Bhd, one of Malaysia's largest conglomerates.

Rules
Legend competitions take place in an eight-sided MMA arena called the "Ba Fang".

Legend contest rules are a hybrid of the Unified Rules of Mixed Martial Arts and Pride-style MMA rules. Some of the rules unique to Legend are:

•	No elbow drops.

•	All contests (including championship fights) are three rounds of five minutes duration.

•	There are no draws at Legend. If two fighters are tied on points on a judge's scorecard at the end of three rounds, the judge must make a determination as to which fighter he/she believes won the overall fight.

Weight divisions

▪	Bantamweight: Under 50 kilograms

▪	Featherweight: 50 to 60 kilograms

▪	Lightweight: 60 to 70 kilograms

▪	Welterweight: 70 to 80 kilograms

▪	Middleweight: 80 to 90 kilograms

▪	Cruiserweight: 90 to 100 kilograms

▪	Heavyweight: Over 100 kilograms

Past Legend champions

List of events

References

External links
 
 List of Events on Sherdog

2009 establishments in Hong Kong
2013 disestablishments in Hong Kong
Mixed martial arts organizations
Entertainment companies established in 2009
Companies disestablished in 2013